Gamma Arae (γ Ara, γ Arae) is a star in the southern constellation of Ara. With an apparent visual magnitude of 3.3, it is the fourth-brightest star in the constellation and is readily visible to the naked eye.

This is an enormous star with 23 times the radius of the Sun. It is radiating 120,000 as much energy as the Sun from its outer envelope at an effective temperature of 21,500 K. This heat gives the star the blue-white glow of a B-type star. The spectrum shows it to match a stellar classification of B1 Ib, with the luminosity class of 'Ib' indicating this is a lower luminosity supergiant star. It is a relatively young body, with an estimated age of around 15.7 million years.

Gamma Arae is rotating rapidly with a projected rotational velocity of 269 km s−1, causing it to complete a full rotation about every 4.8 days. In the spectrum of this star, this high rate of spin is causing absorption lines to blend together because of the Doppler effect, making them more difficult to analyze. It is a periodically variable star that undergoes non-radial pulsations with a primary period of 1.1811 days and a secondary period of 0.1281 days.

There is some disagreement about the mass of this star in the literature. Tetzlaff et al. (2011) estimate the mass as  solar masses, while Fraser et al. (2010) give a mass of around 19 and Lefever et al. (2007) lists a value of 25. It is shedding mass through its stellar wind at the rate of 3.0 × 10−8 solar masses per year, which is equivalent to losing the mass of the Sun every 33 million years. The wind is being effected by the star's rapid rotation, resulting in an enhanced outflow along the equator.

Gamma Arae has an optical companion located at an angular separation of 17.9 arcseconds, which is an A-type main sequence star with an apparent magnitude of 10.5.

References

External links
 HR 6462
 Image Gamma Arae

157246
Arae, Gamma
Ara (constellation)
Double stars
B-type supergiants
A-type main-sequence stars
085267
6462
Durchmusterung objects